The Fussball Club Basel 1893 1990–91 season was their 97th season since the club's foundation. Charles Röthlisberger was the club's chairman for the third consecutive year. FC Basel played their home games in the St. Jakob Stadium. Following their relegation in the 1987–88 season this was their third season in the second tier of Swiss football.

Overview 
Ernst August Künnecke returned to the club, having taken over from Urs Siegenthaler as first-team coach during the previous. After missing promotion the previous two seasons, the club's repeated priority aim was to return to the top flight of Swiss football. Only a few players left the team. Andre Rindlisbacher transferred to Bellinzona, Uwe Wassmer to Aarau and Ralph Thoma returned to his club of origin FC Rheinfelden. Rolf Baumann ended his active football career and returned to his hometown club VfL Kirchheim/Teck as head-coach. Four other players left the squad because their contracts were not renewed. In the other direction Brian Bertelsen and Reto Baumgartner moved in from Wettingen. Maximilian Heidenreich transferred in from Hannover 96. Three young players came in from local, lower-tier teams, Roman Künzli from FC Breitenbach, Roman Hangarter from FC Brüttisellen and Christian Marcolli from FC Aesch. Seven young players were brought up from the Basel youth team.

The 24 teams in the Nationalliga B were divided into two groups, a South/East and a West group, to first play a qualification round. In the second stage the tops six teams in each group and the last four teams of the Nationalliga A would play a promotion/relegation round, also divided into two groups. The top two teams in each of these groups would play in the top flight the next season. Basel were assigned to the South East group. The first stage ran very moderately, there was no consistency in their games and matches were lost that should have been won. They ended their 22 matches in the Qualifying Phase with 9 victories, 8 draws and 5 defeats with 26 points in a disappointing fourth position in the league table. The team scored 40 goals and conceded 30.

Basel qualified for a promotion group and were assigned to group A. Also qualified for this group from the Nationalliga B were Chiasso, Yverdon-Sports, Fribourg, Baden and Etoile Carouge. Fighting against their relegation from the Nationalliga A were St. Gallen and Wettingen. At the start of this phase Basel lost two games, away against Yverdon-Sports and at home against St. Gallen and therefore they were in arrears right from the beginning. Even the away victory against Wettingen didn't help much, because they were defeated at home by FC Baden just two rounds later. A few weeks later the back to back home defeat against Wettingen and the defeat in the Espenmoos against St. Gallen decided the promotion/relegation phase to the benefit of these two teams. Basel ended their 14 matches in the promotion/relegation phase with just four victories, four draws, suffering six defeats with 12 points in a very disappointing fourth position in the league table and missed promotion again.

In the Swiss Cup second round Basel were drawn with an away game against lower tier, local club FC Pratteln. But Basel were sent home suffering an embarrassing 4–0 defeat. A red card for Peter Bernauer just after half time, as the game was still goalless, made Basel very unsure. Pratteln took the lead and Basel were not able to give an adequate answer. In fact, in the last few minutes of the game, they fell completely apart and gave up two counter goals within less than 60 seconds.

Players 

 
 
 
 
 

 
 

 

 
 

 
 

 
 

Players who left the squad

Results 

Legend

Friendly matches

Pre-season

Winter break

Nationalliga B

Qualifying Phase South East

League table

Promotion/relegation phase Group A

League table

Swiss Cup

See also 
 History of FC Basel
 List of FC Basel players
 List of FC Basel seasons

References

Sources 
 Rotblau: Jahrbuch Saison 2015/2016. Publisher: FC Basel Marketing AG. 
 Die ersten 125 Jahre / 2018. Publisher: Josef Zindel im Friedrich Reinhardt Verlag, Basel. 
 The FCB squad 1990–91 at fcb-archiv.ch
 1990–91 at RSSSF

External links
 FC Basel official site

FC Basel seasons
Basel